Bidrubeh-ye Sofla (also Romanized as Bīdrūbeh-ye Soflá; also known as Bīd Rooyeh Fat-h Alī, Bīdrūbeh, Bīdrū”īyeh Falḩ‘alī, Bīdrūweh, and Bīdrūye-ye Fatḩ‘alī) is a village in Hoseyniyeh Rural District, Alvar-e Garmsiri District, Andimeshk County, Khuzestan Province, Iran. At the 2006 census, its population was 99, in 24 families.

References 

Populated places in Andimeshk County